Future Cops (literal title: Super-School Tyrant) is a 1993 Hong Kong action-comedy film loosely based on the Street Fighter video game franchise, starring an ensemble cast of Andy Lau, Jacky Cheung, Aaron Kwok, Chingmy Yau, Dicky Cheung and Simon Yam.

It was the second live-action film to feature characters inspired by the Street Fighter series, the first being City Hunter starring Jackie Chan, which was also directed by Wong Jing, but released 6 months earlier. The following year the official Street Fighter motion picture was released, starring Jean-Claude Van Damme.

Plot
In the year 2043, an evil crime lord The General is trying to take over the world. He was arrested and was sentenced to jail by the Judge. The General's minions, Kent, Thai King, and Toyota travel to the year 1993 to kill the Judge before he has a chance to get into office. During a battle with The General's minions, the Future Cops Lung, Broomhead, Ti Man, and Sing hear of their plot. The Police Director decides to send them back to the past also to protect the Judge. Lung ultimately stays behind because he is the Police Director's brother in law.

Once the Future Cops get to 1993, they land in the backyard of 20-something year old high school student Tai-Hung, who helps them stay under cover by letting them live with him and his family. Ti Man pretends to be a fellow student while striking up a romance with Tai-Hung's sister Chun-May; Broomhead pretends to be a music teacher at the school while also striking up a romance with one of the students, Crab Angel; while Sing follows Tai-Hung pretending to be his servant, all the while protecting him from the evil school bullies, while Tai-Hung pursues a romance of his own with his long-time friend, Choi-Nei. Eventually the villains show up, wreak havoc, and many battles ensue.

Kent also goes undercover as a teacher in an effort to find out the identity of Tai-Hung. He subtly ambushes Ti Man with poison that regresses his intelligence to those of a 5-year old, before tricking Crab Angel into bringing him to a lover's spot. Broomhead tails them, and after a series of fights, decides not to kill Kent. Kent, not wanting to owe him a favour, injects the antidote into Ti Man before leaving.

The General eventually takes over the school as the principal and has the school in a lockdown to force the cops to hand over Tai-Hung.

At Tai-Hung's birthday party, he realizes that the villains are after him and wishes to coward his way out of the situation. This continues even after the cops inject microchips into Tai-Hung, Chun-May, Tai-Hung's father and Tai-Hung's mother to give them super powers.

The cops confront the villains in the school. After crashing his hoverboard into the school building, Tai-Hung manages to awaken his powers. Meanwhile, the other heroes fight with The General, but are unable to defeat him. Kent, disagreeing with the way The General approaches the matter, becomes a turncoat and joins in the fight. Only when all the heroes join forces are they able to win.

Cast

Game references and differences
 In the final battle of the film, Chun-may and her mother simultaneously (both dressed as Chun-Li) perform Chun-Li's "yatta!" win animation from Street Fighter II.
 In the scene where Ti Man and Chun-may are on a date at an arcade, they jump into a game of Super Mario World.
 When Tai-hung wakes up to his abilities as Yu Tit-hung, he is dressed up as the character Son Goku from the Dragon Ball franchise.
 Kei-on is seen playing an actual Street Fighter II game in the arcades.

External links
 
 

1993 films
1993 action comedy films
1993 martial arts films
Hong Kong action comedy films
Hong Kong martial arts films
Hong Kong science fiction films
1990s Cantonese-language films
Films about time travel
Films directed by Wong Jing
Films set in 1993
Films set in the 2040s
Live-action films based on video games
Martial arts comedy films
Martial arts science fiction films
Golden Harvest films
1990s Hong Kong films